Gerhard Stapelfeldt (born October 26, 1947, Hamburg, Germany) is a German sociologist. He was a university teacher at University of Hamburg until December 2010.

In 1979 Stapelfeldt published his PhD Thesis, a reconstruction and interpretation of Karl Marx's Das Kapital with special reference to Marx's further studies and writings. Following this interpretation he then put its consequences into practice by developing a  programme of depicting and interpreting political economy, from mercantilism, to Liberalism, imperialism and finally Neoliberalism.

The focal point of his studies lies in the critical theory of society and the history of ideas while his theoretical point of reference is the Critical theory of the Frankfurt School, with theorists like Max Horkheimer, Theodor W. Adorno or Herbert Marcuse, and of Karl Marx. Other major influences on his thinking come from Greek philosophy, Georg Friedrich Wilhelm Hegel or Sigmund Freud. He teaches sociology but also social history, economic history and philosophy.

His major work is a three-part work, also his professorial dissertation, the Critique of Economic Rationality (Kritik der ökonomischen Rationalität), which describes the genesis as well as the logic, institutional and empirical structure of capitalism in the eras of state-interventionism and Neoliberalism. It contains a general historical-philosophical part as well as examinations of the political economy of the Federal Republic of Germany, the European Union and world economy.

Among his current works is an analysis of the Euro crisis (http://www.kritiknetz.de). In this interpretation he shows and explains the history of the Euro and criticises that European policy mainly took the currency - and not political ideas - as EU-European identity.

Works 
Das Problem des Anfangs in der Kritik der politischen Ökonomie, Campus, Frankfurt am Main / New York 1979
Peru - im Namen der Freiheit ins Elend, Fischer, Frankfurt am Main 1984
Verelendung und Urbanisierung in der Dritten Welt, Breitenbach, Saarbrücken 1990
Kritik der ökonomischen Rationalität, Erster Band: Geschichte der ökonomischen Rationalisierung, Lit, Münster 1998, ²2004
Kritik der ökonomischen Rationalität, Zweiter Band: Wirtschaft und Gesellschaft der Bundesrepublik Deutschland, Lit, Münster 1998, 

Der Merkantilismus. Die Genese der Weltgesellschaft vom 16. bis zum 18. Jahrhundert, Ça Ira: Freiburg 2001, 
Geist und Geld, Lit, Münster 2003
Theorie der Gesellschaft und empirische Sozialforschung. Zur Logik der Aufklärung des Unbewussten, Ça Ira, Freiburg 2004
Zur deutschen Ideologie, Lit, Münster 2005
Der Liberalismus. Die Gesellschaftstheorien von Smith, Ricardo, Marx, Ça Ira, Freiburg 2006, 
Der Aufbruch des konformistischen Geistes. Thesen zur Kritik der neoliberalen Universität, Kovac, Hamburg 2007, 
Mythos und Logos. Antike Philosophie von Homer bis Sokrates, Verlag Dr. Kovac, Hamburg 2007, 
Der Imperialismus – Krise und Krieg 1870/73 bis 1918/29, Erster Band: Politische Ökonomie, Verlag Dr. Kovac, Hamburg 2008, 
Der Imperialismus – Krise und Krieg 1870/73 bis 1918/29, Zweiter Band: Anthropologie und Rationalität, Verlag Dr. Kovac, Hamburg 2008, 
Das Problem des Anfangs in der Kritik der Politischen Ökonomie von Karl Marx. Zum Verhältnis von Arbeitsbegriff und Dialektik, 2. erw. Auflage (hgg. von Bastian Bredtmann und Hanno Plass), Verlag Dr. Kovac, Hamburg 2009, 
Kapitalistische Weltökonomie. Vom Staatsinterventionismus zum Neoliberalismus. Kritik der ökonomischen Rationalität. Vierter Band, erstes Buch. Verlag Dr. Kovac, Hamburg 2009, .
Kapitalistische Weltökonomie. Vom Staatsinterventionismus zum Neoliberalismus. Kritik der ökonomischen Rationalität. Vierter Band, zweites Buch. Verlag Dr. Kovac, Hamburg 2009, .

References

Further reading
Katharina Böttcher/Ulrike Flader/Gerald Gönen/Paul Kramer (Hgg.): Wege zur Reflexion. Unbehagen – Aufklärung – Gesellschaftskritik. Für Gerhard Stapelfeldt zum 60. Geburtstag, Verlag Dr. Kovac, Hamburg 2008, 

1947 births
Living people
German sociologists
Critical theorists
Frankfurt School
German male writers